Hendel is a surname, and may refer to:

 Frank B. Hendel (1892–1973), New York politician
 Friedrich Georg Hendel (1874–1936), Austrian high school director and entomologist mainly interested in Diptera
 Geerd Hendel (1903–1998), naval architect and native of Germany
 Nechama Hendel (1936–1998), Israeli singer
 Yoaz Hendel (born 1975), Israeli military historian, journalist and politician
 Zvi Hendel (born 1949), Israeli politician

See also
 Walter Hendl (1917–2007), American musician
 Handel (disambiguation)
 Handle (disambiguation)
 Hendl
Surnames from given names